Ryan O'Connor (born 27 June 1974) is a former Australian rules football player.  He is best known for playing for the Essendon Bombers and Sydney Swans in the Australian Football League. He then continued his career in the SANFL with the Port Adelaide Magpies where he won the Magarey Medal. He finished his career with VFL club Coburg in 2005 after winning the Best & Fairest in 2004.

O'Connor, from Ulverstone, Tasmania began his career at the Essendon reserves after being traded by Geelong in the 1991 AFL Draft for ruckman John Barnes.  Even as a young man, O'Connor was known for his massive size (191 cm, 110 kg), considered large even for an AFL player.  Despite his bulk and struggle with weight problems, the big man was surprisingly agile and could take strong contested marks.

O'Connor's best year was 1995.  He became a centre half forward and strung together a number of impressive games, kicking bags of goals.

1995 put Ryan O'Connor on the map. He stepped up to become an important forward who took the rucking duties in the front half.

In 1997 O'Connor was involved in a car accident which had an effect on his form.  He was delisted by the Bombers.

The Sydney Swans picked up O'Connor and used him at centre half forward and centre half back.  After a few reasonable seasons, the power forward was delisted at the end of 2000.

The Port Adelaide Magpies picked up O'Connor, where he starred, winning the Magarey Medal in 2001, alongside former St Kilda player Tony Brown.

O'Connor then moved back to Melbourne in 2004, and joined Coburg, winning the Best & Fairest that year. Retiring midway through 2005, he would be thrust into the role of General Manager, a role he held until 2009. O'Connor is currently the Talent Manager with TAC Cup side Sandringham Dragons where he has been since 2010.

References

External links

Australian rules footballers from Tasmania
Essendon Football Club players
Sydney Swans players
Port Adelaide Magpies players
Coburg Football Club players
Magarey Medal winners
Allies State of Origin players
Living people
1974 births